The following outline is provided as a topical overview of science; the discipline of science is defined as both the systematic effort of acquiring knowledge through observation, experimentation and reasoning, and the body of knowledge thus acquired, the word "science" derives from the Latin word scientia meaning knowledge. A practitioner of science is called a "scientist". Modern science respects objective logical reasoning, and follows a set of core procedures or rules to determine the nature and underlying natural laws of all things, with a scope encompassing the entire universe. These procedures, or rules, are known as the scientific method.

Essence of science 
 Research – systematic investigation into existing or new knowledge.
 Scientific discovery – observation of new phenomena, new actions, or new events and providing new reasoning to explain the knowledge gathered through such observations with previously acquired knowledge from abstract thought and everyday experiences.
 Laboratory – facility that provides controlled conditions in which scientific research, experiments, and measurement may be performed.
 Objectivity – the idea that scientists, in attempting to uncover truths about the natural world, must aspire to eliminate personal or cognitive biases, a priori commitments, emotional involvement, etc.
 Inquiry – any process that has the aim of augmenting knowledge, resolving doubt, or solving a problem.

Scientific method 
Scientific method   (outline) – body of techniques for investigating phenomena and acquiring new knowledge, as well as for correcting and integrating previous knowledge. It is based on observable, empirical, measurable evidence, and subject to laws of reasoning, both deductive and inductive.
 Empirical method –
 Experimental method – The steps involved to produce a reliable and logical conclusion include:
 Conducting initial research and asking a question about a natural phenomenon
 Making observations of the phenomenon and/or collecting data about it
 Forming a hypothesis – proposed explanation for a phenomenon. For a hypothesis to be a scientific hypothesis, the scientific method requires that one can test it. Scientists generally base scientific hypotheses on previous observations that cannot satisfactorily be explained with the available scientific theories. 
 Predicting a logical consequence of the hypothesis
 Testing the hypothesis through an experiment – methodical procedure carried out with the goal of verifying, falsifying, or establishing the validity of a hypothesis. The 3 types of scientific experiments are:
 Controlled experiment – experiment that compares the results obtained from an experimental sample against a control sample, which is practically identical to the experimental sample except for the one aspect the effect of which is being tested (the independent variable).
 Natural experiment – empirical study in which the experimental conditions (i.e., which units receive which treatment) are determined by nature or by other factors out of the control of the experimenters and yet the treatment assignment process is arguably exogenous. Thus, natural experiments are observational studies and are not controlled in the traditional sense of a randomized experiment.
 Observational study – draws inferences about the possible effect of a treatment on subjects, where the assignment of subjects into a treated group versus a control group is outside the control of the investigator.
 Field experiment – applies the scientific method to experimentally examine an intervention in the real world (or as many experimentalists like to say, naturally occurring environments) rather than in the laboratory.  See also field research.
 Gather and analyze data from experiments or observations, including indicators of uncertainty.
 Draw conclusions by comparing data with predictions.  Possible outcomes:
 Conclusive:
 The hypothesis is falsified by the data.  
 Data are consistent with the hypothesis.
 Data are consistent with alternative hypotheses. 
 Inconclusive:
 Data are not relevant to the hypothesis, or data and predictions are incommensurate.
 There is too much uncertainty in the data to draw any conclusion.
 Further steps include peer review and enabling others to reproduce or falsify the observations and/or conclusions
 Deductive-nomological model
 Scientific modelling –
 Models of scientific method
 Hypothetico-deductive model – proposed description of scientific method. According to it, scientific inquiry proceeds by formulating a hypothesis in a form that could conceivably be falsified by a test on observable data. A test that could and does run contrary to predictions of the hypothesis is taken as a falsification of the hypothesis. A test that could but does not run contrary to the hypothesis corroborates the theory.

Branches of science 

Branches of science – divisions within science with respect to the entity or system concerned, which typically embodies its own terminology and nomenclature. The most traditional data structure used for organizing the subfields of science is the "tree of knowledge", hence the idea of different scientific "branches". But over time, several other taxonomic systems have also been proposed for that purpose (such as networks, tables or circular schemes).

Formal science 
Formal science – branches of knowledge that are concerned with formal systems, such as those under the branches of: logic, mathematics, computer science, statistics, and some aspects of linguistics. Unlike other sciences, the formal sciences are not concerned with the validity of theories based on observations in the real world, but instead with the properties of formal systems based on definitions and rules.
 Branches of formal science (also known as the formal sciences)

Natural science 
Natural science   (outline) – a major branch of science that tries to explain and predict nature's phenomena, based on empirical evidence. In natural science, hypotheses must be verified scientifically to be regarded as scientific theory. Validity, accuracy, and social mechanisms ensuring quality control, such as peer review and repeatability of findings, are among the criteria and methods used for this purpose. Natural science can be broken into two main branches: biology and physical science. Each of these branches, and all of their sub-branches, are referred to as natural sciences.
 Branches of natural science (also known as the natural sciences)

Social science 
Social science – study of the social world constructed between humans. The social sciences usually limit themselves to an anthropomorphically centric view of these interactions with minimal emphasis on the inadvertent impact of social human behavior on the external environment (physical, biological, ecological, etc.). 'Social' is the concept of exchange/influence of ideas, thoughts, and relationship interactions (resulting in harmony, peace, self enrichment, favoritism, maliciousness, justice seeking, etc.) between humans. The scientific method is used in many social sciences, albeit adapted to the needs of the social construct being studied.
 Branches of social science (also known as the social sciences)

Applied science 
Applied science – branch of science that applies existing scientific knowledge to develop more practical applications, including inventions and other technological advancements.
 Branches of applied science (also known as the applied sciences)

Essence science 
Essence science – is a science that discusses problems ranging from general and core questions to major scientific problems in both social and natural sciences, among other things. Philosophy is an example of an essential science that can be classified as a subset of it.
 Branches of Essence science (also known as the Essence sciences)

Types of scientific fields 
 Exact science – any field of science capable of accurate quantitative expression or precise predictions and rigorous methods of testing hypotheses, especially reproducible experiments involving quantifiable predictions and measurements.
 Fundamental science – science that describes the most basic objects, forces, relations between them and laws governing them, such that all other phenomena may be in principle derived from them following the logic of scientific reductionism.
 Hard and soft science – colloquial terms often used when comparing scientific fields of academic research or scholarship, with hard meaning perceived as being more scientific, rigorous, or accurate.

Politics of science 
 Disruptive technology – innovation that helps create a new market and value network, and eventually goes on to disrupt an existing market and value network (over a few years or decades), displacing an earlier technology.
 Kansas evolution hearings – series of hearings held in Topeka, Kansas, United States 5 to 12 May 2005 by the Kansas State Board of Education and its State Board Science Hearing Committee to change how evolution and the origin of life would be taught in the state's public high school science classes.
 List of books about the politics of science – list of books about the politics of science.
 Politicization of science – politicization of science is the manipulation of science for political gain.
 Science by press release – refers to scientists who put an unusual focus on publicizing results of research in the media.

History of science 

 History of science – history of science in general
 History of scientific method – history of scientific method is a history of the methodology of scientific inquiry, as differentiated from a history of science in general.
 Theories/sociology of science – sociology and philosophy of science, as well as the entire field of science studies, have in the 20th century been occupied with the question of large-scale patterns and trends in the development of science, and asking questions about how science "works" both in a philosophical and practical sense.
 Historiography – study of the history and methodology of the sub-discipline of history, known as the history of science, including its disciplinary aspects and practices (methods, theories, schools) and to the study of its own historical development ("History of History of Science", i.e., the history of the discipline called History of Science).
 History of pseudoscience – history of pseudoscience is the study of pseudoscientific theories over time. A pseudoscience is a set of ideas that presents itself as science, while it does not meet the criteria to properly be called such.
 Timeline of scientific discoveries – shows the date of publication of major scientific theories and discoveries, along with the discoverer. In many cases, the discoveries spanned several years.
 Timeline of scientific thought – lists the major landmarks across all scientific philosophy and methodological sciences.

By period 
 History of science in early cultures – history of science in early cultures refers to the study of protoscience in ancient history, prior to the development of science in the Middle Ages.
 History of science in Classical Antiquity – history of science in classical antiquity encompasses both those inquiries into the workings of the universe aimed at such practical goals as establishing a reliable calendar or determining how to cure a variety of illnesses and those abstract investigations known as natural philosophy.
 History of science in the Middle Ages – Science in the Middle Ages comprised the study of nature, including practical disciplines, the mathematics and natural philosophy in medieval Europe.
 History of science in the Renaissance – During the Renaissance, great advances occurred in geography, astronomy, chemistry, physics, mathematics, manufacturing, and engineering.
 Science and inventions of Leonardo da Vinci – Italian polymath, regarded as the epitome of the "Renaissance Man", displaying skills in numerous diverse areas of study.
 Scientific revolution – scientific revolution is an era associated primarily with the 16th and 17th centuries during which new ideas and knowledge in physics, astronomy, biology, medicine and chemistry transformed medieval and ancient views of nature and laid the foundations for modern science.
 Governmental impact on science during WWII – Governmental impact on science during World War II represents the effect of public administration on technological development that provided many advantages to the armed forces, economies and societies in their strategies during the war.

By date 

 List of years in science – events related to science or technology which occurred in the listed year (current year in the box on the right).
 Timeline of scientific discoveries – shows the date of publication of major scientific theories and discoveries, along with the discoverer. In many cases, the discoveries spanned several years.
 Timeline of scientific experiments – shows the date of publication of major scientific experiments.
 Timeline of the history of the scientific method – shows an overview of the cultural inventions that have contributed to the development of the scientific method.
 List of science timelines – more timeline articles

By field 

 History of natural science – study of nature and the physical universe that was dominant before the development of modern science.
 Natural philosophy – study of nature and the physical universe that was dominant before the development of modern science.
 Natural history – scientific research of plants or animals, leaning more towards observational rather than experimental methods of study, and encompasses more research published in magazines than in academic journals.
 History of biology – traces the study of the living world from ancient to modern times.
 History of ecology – history of the science of ecology.
 History of molecular biology – begins in the 1930s with the convergence of various, previously distinct biological disciplines: biochemistry, genetics, microbiology, and virology.
 History of astronomy – Timeline
 History of chemistry – By 1000 BC, ancient civilizations used technologies that would eventually form the basis of the various branches of chemistry.
 History of geography
 History of geology – Timeline
 History of meteorology – Timeline
 History of physics – As forms of science historically developed out of philosophy, physics was originally referred to as natural philosophy, a field of study concerned with "the workings of nature."
 History of science and technology
 History of the social sciences – has origin in the common stock of Western philosophy and shares various precursors, but began most intentionally in the early 19th century with the positivist philosophy of science.
 History of archaeology – Timeline
 History of cognitive science
 History of criminal justice – Throughout the history of criminal justice, evolving forms of punishment, added rights for offenders and victims, and policing reforms have reflected changing customs, political ideals, and economic conditions.
 History of economics – study of different thinkers and theories in the subject that became political economy and economics from the ancient world to the present day.
 History of education – development of systematic methods of teaching and learning.
 History of law – study of how law has evolved and why it changed.
 History of linguistics – endeavors to describe and explain the human faculty of language.
 History of marketing – recognized discipline, along with concomitant changes in marketing theory and practice.
 History of parapsychology
 History of political science – social science discipline concerned with the study of the state, government, and politics.
 History of psychology – Timeline
 History of sociology – Timeline

By region

History of science in present states, by continent 
See – :Category:Science and technology by continent

History of science in historic states 
 Science and technology of the Han Dynasty
 Science and technology in the Ottoman Empire
 Science and technology of the Song Dynasty
 Science and technology in the Soviet Union
 Science and technology of the Tang Dynasty

Philosophy of science 

 Philosophy of science – questions the assumptions, foundations, methods and implications of science.
 Models of scientific inquiry

Adoption, use, results and coordination of science 

 Science and technology studies
 Scientometrics
 Altmetrics
 Article-level metrics
 Expert elicitation
 Lists of science and technology awards
 Research and development
 Innovation
 Science policy
 Knowledge#Science
 Funding of science

Technology and mechanisms of science 
 Timeline of temperature and pressure measurement technology
 Laboratory automation
 History of communication
 Internet research
 Scientific journal
 Peer review
 Metascience

Scientific community 
 Scientific community – group of all interacting scientists.

Scientific organizations 
 Academy of Sciences – national academy or another learned society dedicated to sciences.

Scientists 
 Scientist – practitioner of science; an individual who uses scientific method to objectively inquire into the nature of reality—be it the fundamental laws of physics or how people behave.  There are many names for scientists, often named in relation to the job that they do. One example of this is a biologist, a scientist who studies biology (the study of living organisms and their environments).

Types of scientist

By field 
The scientific fields mentioned below are generally described by the science they study.

 Agricultural scientist – broad multidisciplinary field that encompasses the parts of exact, natural, economic and social sciences that are used in the practice and understanding of agriculture.
 Archaeologist – study of human activity, primarily through the recovery and analysis of the material culture and environmental data that they have left behind, which includes artifacts, architecture, biofacts and cultural landscapes (the archaeological record).
 Astronomer – astronomer is a scientist who studies celestial bodies such as planets, stars and galaxies.
 Astrophysicist – branch of astronomy that deals with the physics of the universe, including the physical properties of celestial objects, as well as their interactions and behavior.
 Biologist – scientist devoted to the study of living organisms and their relationship to their environment.
 Astrobiologist – study of the origin, evolution, distribution, and future of extraterrestrial life.
 Biophysicist – interdisciplinary science that uses the methods of physical science to study biological systems.
 Biotechnologist – field of applied biology that involves the use of living organisms and bioprocesses in engineering, technology, medicine and other fields requiring bioproducts.
 Botanist – discipline of biology, is the science of plant life.
 Cognitive scientists – scientific study of the mind and its processes.
 Ecologist – scientific study of the relations that living organisms have with respect to each other and their natural environment.
 Entomologist – scientific study of insects, a branch of arthropodology.
 Evolutionary biologist – sub-field of biology concerned with the study of the evolutionary processes that have given rise to the diversity of life on Earth.
 Geneticist – biologist who studies genetics, the science of genes, heredity, and variation of organisms.
 Herpetologist – branch of zoology concerned with the study of amphibians (including frogs, toads, salamanders, newts, and gymnophiona) and reptiles (including snakes, lizards, amphibians, turtles, terrapins, tortoises, crocodiles, and the tarantulas).
 Immunologist – branch of biomedical science that covers the study of all aspects of the immune system in all organisms.
 Ichthyologist – study of fish.
 Lepidopterist – person who specializes in the study of Lepidoptera, members of an order encompassing moths and the three superfamilies of butterflies, skipper butterflies, and moth-butterflies.
 Marine biologist – scientific study of organisms in the ocean or other marine or brackish bodies of water.
 Medical scientist – basic research, applied research, or translational research conducted to aid and support the body of knowledge in the field of medicine.
 Microbiologist – study of microscopic organisms.
 Mycologist – branch of biology concerned with the study of fungi, including their genetic and biochemical properties, their taxonomy and their use to humans as a source for tinder, medicinals (e.g., penicillin), food (e.g., beer, wine, cheese, edible mushrooms) and entheogens, as well as their dangers, such as poisoning or infection.
 Neuroscientist – individual who studies the scientific field of neuroscience or any of its related sub-fields.
 Ornithologist – branch of zoology that concerns the study of birds.
 Paleontologist – study of prehistoric life.
 Pathologist – precise study and diagnosis of disease.
 Pharmacologist – branch of medicine and biology concerned with the study of drug action.
 Physiologist – science of the function of living systems.
 Zoologist – branch of biology that relates to the animal kingdom, including the structure, embryology, evolution, classification, habits, and distribution of all animals, both living and extinct.
 Chemist – scientist trained in the study of chemistry.
 Analytical chemist – study of the separation, identification, and quantification of the chemical components of natural and artificial materials.
 Biochemist – study of chemical processes in living organisms, including, but not limited to, living matter.
 Inorganic chemist – branch of chemistry concerned with the properties and behavior of inorganic compounds.
 Organic chemist – subdiscipline within chemistry involving the scientific study of the structure, properties, composition, reactions, and preparation (by synthesis or by other means) of carbon-based compounds, hydrocarbons, and their derivatives.
 Physical chemist – study of macroscopic, atomic, subatomic, and particulate phenomena in chemical systems in terms of physical laws and concepts.
 Earth scientist – all-embracing term for the sciences related to the planet Earth.
 Geologist – scientist who studies the solid and liquid matter that constitutes the Earth as well as the processes and history that has shaped it.
 Glaciologist – study of glaciers, or more generally ice and natural phenomena that involve ice.
 Hydrologist – study of the movement, distribution, and quality of water on Earth and other planets, including the hydrologic cycle, water resources and environmental watershed sustainability.
 Limnologist – study of inland waters
 Meteorologist – study of weather
 Mineralogist – study of chemistry, crystal structure, and physical (including optical) properties of minerals.
 Oceanographer – branch of Earth science that studies the ocean
 Paleontologist – study of prehistoric life
 Seismologist – scientific study of earthquakes and the propagation of elastic waves through the Earth or through other planet-like bodies.
 Volcanologist – study of volcanoes, lava, magma, and related geological, geophysical and geochemical phenomena.
 Informatician – science of information, the practice of information processing, and the engineering of information systems.
 Computer scientist – scientist who has acquired knowledge of computer science, the study of the theoretical foundations of information and computation
 Library scientist – interdisciplinary or multidisciplinary field that applies the practices, perspectives, and tools of management, information technology, education, and other areas to libraries; the collection, organization, preservation, and dissemination of information resources; and the political economy of information.
 Management scientist – study of advanced analytical methods to help make better decisions.
 Mathematician– person with an extensive knowledge of mathematics, a field that has been informally defined as being concerned with numbers, data, collection, quantity, structure, space, and change.
 Statistician – someone who works with theoretical or applied statistics.
 Military scientist – process of translating national defense policy to produce military capability by employing military scientists, including theorists, researchers, experimental scientists, applied scientists, designers, engineers, test technicians, and military personnel responsible for prototyping.
 Physicist – scientist who does research in physics
 Psychologist – professional or academic title used by individuals who practice psychology
 Abnormal psychologist – branch of psychology that studies unusual patterns of behavior, emotion and thought, which may or may not be understood as precipitating a mental disorder.
 Educational psychologist – psychologist whose differentiating functions may include diagnostic and psycho-educational assessment, psychological counseling in educational communities (students, teachers, parents and academic authorities), community-type psycho-educational intervention, and mediation, coordination, and referral to other professionals, at all levels of the educational system.
 Biopsychologist – application of the principles of biology (in particular neurobiology), to the study of physiological, genetic, and developmental mechanisms of behavior in human and non-human animals.
 Clinical psychologist – integration of science, theory and clinical knowledge for the purpose of understanding, preventing, and relieving psychologically based distress or dysfunction and to promote subjective well-being and personal development.
 Comparative psychologist – scientific study of the behavior and mental processes of non-human animals, especially as these relate to the phylogenetic history, adaptive significance, and development of behavior.
 Cognitive psychologist – subdiscipline of psychology exploring internal mental processes. It is the study of how people perceive, remember, think, speak, and solve problems.
 Developmental psychologist – scientific study of systematic psychological changes, emotional changes, and perception changes that occur in human beings over the course of their life span.
 Evolutionary psychologist – approach in the social and natural sciences that examines psychological traits such as memory, perception, and language from a modern evolutionary perspective.
 Experimental psychologist – study of behavior and the processes that underlie it, by means of experiment
 Neuropsychologist – studies the structure and function of the brain as they relate to specific psychological processes and behaviors.
 Social psychologist – scientific study of how people's thoughts, feelings, and behaviors are influenced by the actual, imagined, or implied presence of others.
 Social scientist –  field of study concerned with society and human behaviors.
 Anthropologist – study of humanity.
 Ethnologist – branch of anthropology that compares and analyzes the origins, distribution, technology, religion, language, and social structure of the ethnic, racial, and/or national divisions of humanity.
 Communication scientist – academic field that deals with processes of human communication, commonly defined as the sharing of symbols to create meaning.
 Criminologist – study of criminal behavior
 Demographer – statistical study of populations
 Economist – professional in the social science discipline of economics.
 Geographer – geographer is a scholar whose area of study is geography, the study of Earth's natural environment and human society.
 Political economist – study of production, buying, and selling, and their relations with law, custom, and government, as well as with the distribution of national income and wealth, including through the budget process.
 Political scientist – social science discipline concerned with the study of the state, government, and politics.
 Sociologist –
 Technologist
 Architectural technologist – specialist in the technology of building design and construction
 Educational technologist – specialist in tools to enhance learning
 Engineering technologist – specialist who implements technology within a field of engineering
 Industrial technologist – specialist in the management, operation, and maintenance of complex operation systems
 Medical Technologist – healthcare professional who performs diagnostic analysis on a variety of body fluids
 Radiologic technologist – medical professional who applies doses of radiation for imaging and treatment
 Surgical technologist – health specialist who facilitates the conduct of invasive surgical procedures

By employment status 
 Academic – community of students and scholars engaged in higher education and research.
 Corporate Scientist – someone who is employed by a business to do research and development for the benefit of that business
 Layperson – someone who is not an expert or someone who has not had professional training
 Gentleman scientist – financially independent scientist who pursues scientific study as a hobby.
 Government scientist – scientist employed by a country's government

Famous scientists 

 Aristotle – Greek philosopher and polymath, a student of Plato and teacher of Alexander the Great
 Archimedes – Greek mathematician, physicist, engineer, inventor, and astronomer
 Andreas Vesalius – Flemish anatomist, physician, and author of one of the most influential books on human anatomy, De humani corporis fabrica (On the Structure of the Human Body)
 Nicolaus Copernicus – Renaissance astronomer and the first person to formulate a comprehensive heliocentric cosmology which displaced the Earth from the center of the universe
 Galileo Galilei – Italian physicist, mathematician, astronomer, and philosopher who played a major role in the Scientific Revolution
 Johannes Kepler – German mathematician, astronomer and astrologer. A key figure in the 17th century scientific revolution, he is best known for his eponymous laws of planetary motion, codified by later astronomers, based on his works Astronomia nova, Harmonices Mundi, and Epitome of Copernican Astronomy
 René Descartes – French philosopher, mathematician, and writer who spent most of his adult life in the Dutch Republic
 Isaac Newton – English physicist, mathematician, astronomer, natural philosopher, alchemist, and theologian, who has been "considered by many to be the greatest and most influential scientist who ever lived"
 Leonhard Euler – pioneering Swiss mathematician and physicist
 Pierre-Simon Laplace – French mathematician and astronomer whose work was pivotal to the development of mathematical astronomy and statistics
 Alexander von Humboldt – German geographer, naturalist and explorer, and the younger brother of the Prussian minister, philosopher and linguist Wilhelm von Humboldt
 Charles Darwin – English naturalist, he established that all species of life have descended over time from common ancestors, and proposed the scientific theory that this branching pattern of evolution resulted from a process that he called natural selection
 James Clerk Maxwell – Scottish physicist and mathematician
 Marie Curie – Polish physicist and chemist famous for her pioneering research on radioactivity
 Albert Einstein – German-born theoretical physicist who developed the theory of general relativity, effecting a revolution in physics
 Linus Pauling – American chemist, biochemist, peace activist, author, and educator. He was one of the most influential chemists in history and ranks among the most important scientists of the 20th century
 John Bardeen – American physicist and electrical engineer, the only person to have won the Nobel Prize in Physics twice
 Frederick Sanger – English biochemist and a two-time Nobel laureate in chemistry, the only person to have been so
 Stephen Hawking – British theoretical physicist, cosmologist, and author

Science education 
Science education
 Scientific literacy – encompasses written, numerical, and digital literacy as they pertain to understanding science, its methodology, observations, and theories.

Pseudo-scholarship – is a work (e.g., publication, lecture) or body of work that is presented as, but is not, the product of rigorous and objective study or research; the act of producing such work; or the pretended learning upon which it is based.
 Science communication

See also 

 Outline of academic disciplines
 Sci-Mate – open collaboration of scientists using Web 2.0 software to address well known challenges in academic publishing and technology transfer
 Science Daily – news website for topical science articles
 Phys.org – news website for topical science articles with some public metrics
 Science.tv – virtual community for people interested in science
 
 Science studies

References 

Science
Science